"TSU" is a song by Canadian rapper Drake. Released on September 3, 2021, as the eighth track from Drake's sixth studio album Certified Lover Boy. It samples OG Ron C's chopped and screwed remix to R.Kelly's Half on a Baby. The song's intro and outro has featured vocals from the late DJ Screw.

Composition
"TSU" samples OG Ron C from F*ck Action 14 mixtape, talking over the chopped and screwed remix of "Half on a Baby", written and performed by R. Kelly; samples of "Sailing", written by Christopher Cross, as performed by NSYNC; and samples of "Until the End of Time", written by Justin Timberlake, Timothy Mosley, and Floyd Hills, as performed by Justin Timberlake.

Charts

Weekly charts

Year-end charts

References

2021 songs
Drake (musician) songs
Songs written by Drake (musician)
Songs written by Christopher Cross
Songs written by R. Kelly
Songs written by Timbaland
Songs written by Justin Timberlake
Songs written by Danja (record producer)